University College of Engineering (BIT Campus), Anna University Tiruchirappalli otherwise Anna University Chennai – Regional Office, Tiruchirappalli (AUC-ROT), erstwhile Anna University of Technology, Tiruchirappalli, is a technical university department of Anna University, It is located on Tiruchirappalli–Pudukkottai  National Highway 336, Tamil Nadu, India. It was established on 1999 as a part of Bharathidasan University with five departments viz., Bio-Technology, Petrochemical Technology, Information Technology and Pharmaceutical Technology. In 2007, due to management constrains Anna University was split into six universities, namely: Anna University, Chennai; Anna University, Chennai – Taramani Campus; Anna University Chennai - Regional Office, Coimbatore; Anna University Chennai - Regional Office, Madurai; Anna University Chennai – Regional Office, Tiruchirappalli; Anna University Chennai - Regional Office, Tirunelveli. Government acquired this campus from Bharathidasan University and renamed it as Anna University Tiruchirappalli in 2007.The university is an accredited university with powers to grant affiliations to colleges and universities conducting graduate and post graduate studies, as well as diploma courses, and is so recognized by the UGC.

Anna University Tiruchirappalli offers higher education in Engineering, Technology, Management and allied sciences at undergraduate, postgraduate and doctorate level. It also offers Post Graduate Courses to teaching faculties of other colleges to enrich their academic career through Modular Based Credit Banking System (MBCBS).The AUTianz, is the official students' e-Magazine of Anna University of Technology, Tiruchirappalli.

History
Anna University Chennai – Regional Office, Tiruchirappalli was formerly known as Anna University of Technology, Tiruchirappalli which is previously known as the School of Engineering and Technology of the Bharathidasan University, and later the Bharathidasan Institute of Technology (BIT). In December 2007, it was converted into an affiliating university, with almost all engineering colleges in the south district under its fold and absorbed all the government engineering colleges in Tamil Nadu as its constituent colleges. This includes five constituent engineering colleges, 64 Self-Financing Colleges, 10 MBA colleges, three MCA colleges and three colleges offering architecture.

On 14 September 2011 a bill was passed to merge back the universities. However, the separate universities are still operating.

Timeline of University name

1999–2007      – School of Engineering and Technology, Bharathidasan Institute of Technology (part of Bharathidasan University).
2007–2010      – Anna University Tiruchirappalli.
2010–2012      – Anna University of Technology Tiruchirappalli (Main Campus).
2012–2013      – Bharathidasan Institute of Technology, Tiruchirappalli.
2013 to present – Anna University Chennai- Regional Office Tiruchirappalli (BIT Campus).
2013 to present - University College of Engineering, (BIT Campus), Anna University, Tiruchirappalli 

The name of the university is changing throughout time due to various administration power transfers. But since the beginning, it has retained the name BIT campus among students. During its inception as Anna University, its constituent colleges/campuses are opened in various parts of Tamil Nadu viz., Pattukottai campus, Thirukkuvazhai campus, Ariyalur campus, Dindugal campus, Thoothukudi campus, Ramanathapuram campus, Nagercoil campus and Panruti campus under its control. Subsequently, those campuses were renamed and given to other universities.

Campus
The main campus is situated in the southern part of Tiruchirappalli and extends over  adjoining the Mandaiyur and the Palkalaiperur. The campus houses ten departments, six hostels (3 each for boys and girls), two cottages(using by hostel students one each for boys and girls), a gymnasium (indoor stadium), a government health centre, three banks, Animal Centre(under Pharmaceutical department), canteen, student co-operative store, guest houses for vice-chancellor and VIPs and parking facilities on all buildings. The campus has vast area available for development. It was one of the first University campuses in the world to provide Mechanical and Civil engineering completely in Tamil Medium. Separate editions of various engineering books are exclusively written and translated into Tamil by faculties of this university.

Departments

Engineering

Automobile Engineering
Civil Engineering
Computer Science and Engineering
Electrical and Electronics Engineering
Electronics and Communication Engineering
Mechanical Engineering

Technology
Biotechnology
Information Technology
Petrochemical Technology
Pharmaceutical Technology

Humanities
English
Mathematics
Physics,
Chemistry

Others
Management Studies
Computer Applications

Programmes Offered

In addition to this the university offers MCA, MBA, M.Pharm. in Pharmaceutics, M.Pharm. in Pharmaceutical analysis and Ph.D/MS(by Research) programs in all disciplines. It also conducts National and International conferences/symposium regularly. The departments of this university receives funds from various nodal agencies such as CSIR, DST, DRDO, UGC, TNSCST, ICMR, MNRE for research activities.

References

External links
Anna University of Technology Tiruchirappalli 
Anna University Tiruchirappalli 

Engineering colleges in Tamil Nadu
University and college campuses in India